Ralph Michael Saenz (born May 17, 1965), better known as Michael Starr, is an American musician who is best known as the lead vocalist and occasional guitarist of the comedic glam metal band Steel Panther.

Early life 
Ralph Michael Saenz was born in Chicago on May 17, 1965. He is of Spanish and Swedish descent. He was raised primarily in the Van Nuys neighborhood of Los Angeles, where his father was a college professor. He is often cited as having a Ph.D. in English from University of California, Berkeley, however, this is a common misconception, as Saenz had lied about his education to get an apartment when his credit was being checked.

Career 
Saenz was the lead singer for the David Lee Roth-era Van Halen tribute band Atomic Punks from May 1994 to December 2008, where he used the stage name David Lee Ralph. He formed the band with future bandmate, Steel Panther guitarist Russ Parrish. Saenz was briefly the lead singer for L.A. Guns, singing on the Wasted EP. He also has sung for the band 7% Solution.

Saenz formed Steel Panther, a satirical metal band, in 2000 with Parrish under the name Metal Shop (soon changed into Metal Skool, Danger Kitty [for a commercial], then into Steel Panther). The band has become successful worldwide, and has many celebrity fans who have performed onstage with them.

He provided background vocals for AFI on the albums Sing the Sorrow and Decemberunderground

Discography

With Steel Panther 

 Hole Patrol (2003)
 Feel the Steel (2009)
 Balls Out (2011)
 All You Can Eat (2014)
 Lower the Bar (2017)
 Heavy Metal Rules (2019)
 On The Prowl (2023)

With Metal Sludge 
 Hey That's What I Call Sludge – Vol 1 (2003)

With L.A. Guns 
 Wasted (1998)

Guest appearances 
 Fozzy – Do You Wanna Start a War (vocals on "Tonight")
 Gus G. – I Am the Fire (vocals on "Redemption")
 Ninja Sex Party – Attitude City and Level Up (vocals on "6969")
 Nanowar of Steel – Uranus
 Various artists – Peacemaker (featured artist in "Pumped Up Kicks")
Crashdïet - Automaton (Vocals on "Powerline")

References

External links 
 Rock Pit Interview
 

1965 births
American male comedians
21st-century American comedians
American rock singers
Glam metal musicians
L.A. Guns members
Living people
Steel Panther
University of California, Berkeley alumni